is a Japanese footballer who plays as a defensive midfielder for J2 League club Tochigi SC, on loan from Kashiwa Reysol.

Career statistics

Club
.

References

External links

2000 births
Living people
Sportspeople from Chiba Prefecture
Association football people from Chiba Prefecture
Japanese footballers
Association football midfielders
J1 League players
Kashiwa Reysol players
J2 League players
Tochigi SC players